Cameron "Cam" Smedley (born October 9, 1990) is a Canadian slalom canoeist who has competed at the international level since 2006. Smedley competes as a member of the Canadian National Whitewater Slalom Team. He competes in the C1 class (single boat Canadian canoe). Until 2015 he also competed in C2 (pair boat Canadian canoe) with his partner Ben Hayward.

Biography
Smedley was born to James Smedley and Sherri Audet. He has an older sister Alison and a younger brother Liam, who is also a member of the canoe slalom national team. He took up canoeing as a child following his parents and started competing aged 13. In 2005 he was included to the national junior team and in 2008 placed ninth at the Junior World Championships. He competed in his first senior level ICF Canoe Slalom World Championships in 2009 (La Seu d'Urgell, Spain). He attended West Carleton Secondary School in Dunrobin, Ontario, and graduated in 2008. He is currently attending Carleton University, and is enrolled in Mechanical Engineering.

In June 2016, Smedley was named to Canada's 2016 Olympic team. He finished 15th in the C1 event at the 2016 Summer Olympics in Rio de Janeiro.

Cameron finished in 9th place at the 2019 World Championships, earning Canada and himself a quota for the 2020 Summer Olympics. He finished in 16th place in the C1 event after being eliminated in the heats.

He instructs Kayak students at the Pumphouse Whitewater Course for the Ottawa River Runners

World Cup individual podiums

1 Pan American Championship counting for World Cup points

References

External links

1990 births
Living people
Canadian male canoeists
Sportspeople from Ottawa
Canoeists at the 2015 Pan American Games
Pan American Games silver medalists for Canada
Canoeists at the 2016 Summer Olympics
Olympic canoeists of Canada
Pan American Games medalists in canoeing
Medalists at the 2015 Pan American Games
Canoeists at the 2020 Summer Olympics